Bella Vita is a song by DJ Antoine

Bella Vita or La Bella Vita may refer to:

La bella vita (1935) Alberto Moravia
"Bella Vita" (David et Jonathan song), a 1987 song by David et Jonathan
La bella vita, a 1994 Italian comedy drama film. 
"Bella Vita", album Leandro Barsotti

See also
 La vita è bella (disambiguation)
 Belle vie (disambiguation)
 Beautiful Life (disambiguation)